Pauline Jewett,  (December 11, 1922 – July 5, 1992) was a Canadian Liberal and later New Democratic Party Member of Parliament.

Life and career
Jewett was born in St. Catharines, Ontario, where she attended elementary and secondary school. She was the daughter of Mrs. F.C. Jewett, a descendant of Northumberland, Ontario. In 1944, she received a BA in politics and philosophy. In the following year, she received an MA from Queen's University. She obtained a Ph.D in political science at Radcliffe College, Harvard University in 1949. She continued her studies at the London School of Economics and Oxford University.

Jewett went on to lecture at Wellesley College, Queen's University and Carleton University. At Carleton University, she was the chairman of the department of political science from 1960 to 1961 and served as Director of the Institute of Canadian Studies from 1967 to 1972.

In 1961, Jewett became a resident of Brighton, Ontario, in the constituency of Northumberland. In the 1962 federal election, she ran as a Liberal candidate in the riding of Northumberland. She lost by 758 votes to the Progressive Conservative candidate, Harry Bradley. In the 1963 election, she defeated Harry Bradley by 505 votes. However, in the 1965 election, she lost to a different Progressive Conservative candidate, George Hees, by 563 votes.

After Liberal Prime Minister Pierre Trudeau invoked the War Measures Act during the October Crisis, Jewett quit the Liberal Party and joined the New Democratic Party. She ran as an NDP candidate in the 1972 election in the riding of Ottawa West, but came in third, losing to the Progressive Conservative candidate, Peter Reilly.

In May 1974, Jewett moved to British Columbia as president of Simon Fraser University. She was the first woman president of a Canadian co-educational university.

Honored with FAO CERES Medal in 1976.

In the 1979 election, she was elected in the riding of New Westminster—Coquitlam as the NDP candidate. She was also re-elected in the 1980 and 1984 elections.

In 1991, she was made an Officer of the Order of Canada, and in 1992, she was appointed to the Privy Council.

Jewett was Chancellor of Carleton University from 1990 until her death from cancer in 1992.

Academic awards
 Medal in politics at Queen's University
 Arts Resident Research Fellowship at Queen's University
 Henry Clay Jackson Fellowship at Radcliffe College, Harvard University
 Marty Memorial Scholarship
 Nuffield Foundation Travel Grants

Memberships
 Consumers' Association of Canada
 Canadian Political Science Association
 Canadian Institute of International Affairs
 Institute of Public Administration of Canada
 President of the Parliamentary Group of World Federalists

Projects in Allied Fields
 Part-author of Canadian Economic Policy (published in 1961)
 Wrote articles on governmental and political issues
 Participated on radio and T.V. broadcasts dealing with public affairs
 Author of the study for Canadian Nurses' Association dealing with the structure of the group

References
 
 
 
Order of Canada
 
 

1922 births
1992 deaths
Members of the House of Commons of Canada from Ontario
Members of the House of Commons of Canada from British Columbia
Liberal Party of Canada MPs
New Democratic Party MPs
Officers of the Order of Canada
Chancellors of Carleton University
Academic staff of Carleton University
Members of the King's Privy Council for Canada
Simon Fraser University
Harvard University alumni
Queen's University at Kingston alumni
Politicians from St. Catharines
Women members of the House of Commons of Canada
Women in Ontario politics
Women in British Columbia politics
Canadian university and college chief executives
20th-century Canadian women politicians
Women heads of universities and colleges
Canadian expatriates in the United States
Canadian expatriates in England